Osrušana or Ustrushana  was a former Iranian region in Transoxiana, home to the Principality of Ushrusana, an important pre-Islamic polity of Central Asia. Oshrusana lay to the south of the great, southernmost bend of the Syr Darya and extended roughly from Samarkand to Khujand. The capital city of Oshrusana was Bunjikat. The exact form of the Iranian name Osrušana is not clear from the sources, but the forms given in Hudud al-'alam, indicate an original *Sorušna.

History 

From the 5th to the 7th century CE, Ushrusana was part of the territory of the Hephthalites, followed by the Western Turks after 560 CE. The Principality probably retained a certain level of autonomy throughout this period, and was ruled directly by the afshins of the Kavus dynasty.

The rulers of the Principality of Ushrusana (Istarawshan) went by the title of "Afshin", and the most famous of whom was Khedār (Arabicised Haydar) b. Kāvūs. Our early knowledge of the ruling family of Oshrusana is derived from the accounts by the Islamic historians (Tabari, Baladhuri, and Ya'qubi) of the final subjugation of that region by the 'Abbasid caliphs and the submission of its rulers to Islam.

During the time when the first Arab invasion of the country took place under Qutayba ibn Muslim (94-5/712-14), Ushrusana was inhabited by an Iranian population, ruled by its own princes who bore the traditional title of  Akhshid or Afshin.  The first invasion by the Arabs did not result in them controlling the area.

According to the Encyclopedia of Islam:

However, during the reign of the caliph al-Mahdi (775-85) the Afshin of Oshrusana is mentioned among several Iranian and Turkic rulers of Transoxania and the Central Asian steppes who submitted nominally to him. But it was not until Harun al-Rashid's reign in 794-95 that Fadl ibn Yahya of the Barmakids led an expedition into Transoxania and received the submission of the ruling Akin, this Kharākana had never previously humbled himself before any other potentate. Further expeditions were nevertheless sent to Oshrusana by Ma'mūn when he was governor in Marv and after he had become Caliph. Afshin Kavus, son of the Afshin Karākana who had submitted to Fadl ibn Yahya, withdrew his allegiance from the Arabs; but shortly after Ma'mun arrived in Baghdad from the east (817-18 or 819-20), a power struggle and dissensions broke out among the reigning family of Oshrusana.

Kawus' son Khaydar, known by his royal title of Afshin, became a general in the Abbasid army and fought against Khurramite rebels and their leader Babak Khoramdin in Azerbaijan (816-837). In 841 Afshin was arrested in Samarra on suspicion of plotting against the Caliphate. A single location was used for the crucifixion of Afshin, Maziyar, and Babak's corpses. After his death Ustrushana was Islamified whereas before he preserved temples from ruin.

There are indications that semi-autonomous Afshins continued to rule over the Ustrushana after control of the region was wrested from the Abbasids by the Saffarids and, soon after, the Samanids.

Notes

See also
Afshin (Caliphate General)
Istaravshan
Ushrusaniyya

References & notes

External links
OSRUŠANA, Encyclopædia Iranica

Former countries in Central Asia
History of Central Asia